Fisenne is a village of Wallonia in the municipality of Érezée, district of Soy, located in the province of Luxembourg, Belgium.

Fisenne contains a medieval fortified farm, dating from the 12th century and originally part of the estate of the prince-bishop of the abbey of Stavelot. The chapel of the village dates from 1713. The village mill traces its origins to 1314, and was constructed by the lords of Durbuy. A 16th-century altarpiece originally located in the village church is today on display in the Gaspar Museum in Arlon.

References

External links

Populated places in Luxembourg (Belgium)